Facing History: The Black Image in American Art, 1710-1940 was the first public exhibition by a major museum to showcase depictions of African Americans in American art. Facing History took place in 1990 and was held at the Corcoran Gallery of Art from January 13 through March 25, and then went to the Brooklyn Museum from April 20 through June 25. The curator of the exhibition, Guy McElroy, died during the Brooklyn portion on May 31.

History
Facing History examined ways in which American artists "...reinforced a number of largely restrictive stereotypes of black identity." The exhibition featured eighty works in three media: drawings, paintings, and sculptures 

Curator Guy McElroy viewed the exhibition as depicting the attitude of society toward African Americans through the works themselves and the response they received in the art market. They made overt political statements, as well as having addressed contemporary issues. Stereotypes, slavery, and violence dominated the images. However, as McElroy stated in the exhibition catalog:

Selected works

References

External links
Brooklyn Museum profile

1990 in art
1990 in Washington, D.C.
1990 in New York City
Art exhibitions in the United States
Brooklyn Museum